Champion Energy Services, LLC is a retail electricity provider (REP) based in Houston, Texas. Champion Energy currently serves residential, governmental, commercial and industrial customers in deregulated electric energy markets in Texas, Illinois, Ohio, Pennsylvania, New Jersey and New York; governmental, commercial and industrial customers in Delaware, Maryland and Washington, D.C.; and natural gas customers in Illinois. The company is a subsidiary of Calpine.

History 
Champion Energy Services, LLC was first licensed by the Public Utility Commission of Texas (PUCT) in 2004. After entering the market in 2005, Champion has seen strong growth and currently serves around 2,000,000 residential customer equivalents, with a peak load of near 4,500 megawatts.

Products and Services
Champion Energy Services offers a variety of retail plans depending on the market served and the customer classification. All markets and customer classifications can select fixed price plans that allow customers to lock in an electricity rate for the term of the agreement. For commercial customers, more complex options are available including index, hybrid (fixed and index combinations), block and index, and layered purchase options. These commercial plans are customer-specific, require greater customer involvement, and have a substantially different risk profile than fixed price plans.

J.D. Power and Associates Rankings 
The company ranked "Highest in Residential Customer Satisfaction with Retail Electric Service" according to the J.D. Power and Associates Texas Residential Retail Electric Provider Customer Satisfaction Studies from 2010-2013 and again from 2015-2016.

See also 
 Deregulation of the Texas electricity market
 Electric Reliability Council of Texas (ERCOT)
 Electricity provider switching

References

External links 

Energy companies of the United States